The PFA Scotland Players' Player of the Year (often called the Players' Player of the Year, or simply the Scottish Player of the Year) is an annual award given to the player who is adjudged to have been the best of the season in Scottish football. The award has been presented since the 1977–78 season and the winner is chosen by a vote amongst the members of the players' trade union, the Professional Footballers' Association Scotland (PFA Scotland). The award was formerly known as the Scottish Professional Footballers' Association Players' Player of the Year, but was renamed after the SPFA became affiliated with the (English) Professional Footballers' Association and rebranded PFA Scotland.

The first winner of the award was Rangers striker Derek Johnstone, and the first non-Scottish winner was Aberdeen goalkeeper Theo Snelders eleven years later. As of 2021, only Henrik Larsson and Scott Brown have won the award more than once. Although there is a separate PFA Scotland Young Player of the Year award, young players remain eligible to win the senior award, and in the 2005–06 season Shaun Maloney became the first player to win both awards in the same season, a feat repeated by Aiden McGeady two years later.

A shortlist of nominees is published in April and the winner of the award, along with the winners of PFA Scotland's other annual awards, is announced at a gala event in Glasgow a few days later. The award is regarded by the players themselves as extremely prestigious, with John Hartson commenting in 2005 that "the award means a lot because it's voted by your fellow professionals" and Shaun Maloney stating in 2006 that "there is no better accolade than to be voted for by your peers and it does mean a lot to me". In 2007 the SPFA was replaced by a new body, PFA Scotland, but the new organisation's awards are considered to be a direct continuation of the SPFA awards.

Winners
The award has been presented on 44 occasions as of 2022, with two players sharing the award on one occasion (2004–05). There have been 43 different winners, with Henrik Larsson and Scott Brown being the only players to have won the award more than once. The table also indicates where the winning player also won one or more of the other major "player of the year" awards in Scottish football, namely the Scottish Football Writers' Association's Footballer of the Year award (SFWA), and the PFA Scotland Young Player of the Year award (SYPY).

Breakdown of winners

Winners by country

Winners by club

See also
PFA Scotland Team of the Year
PFA Scotland Young Player of the Year
SFWA Footballer of the Year
PFA Players' Player of the Year
FWA Footballer of the Year
PFAI Players' Player of the Year
Rex Kingsley Footballer of the Year

References

Scottish football trophies and awards
Awards established in 1978
Footballers in Scotland
1978 establishments in Scotland
Annual events in Scotland
Annual sporting events in the United Kingdom
Scotland
Association football player non-biographical articles